Friction is the force resisting the relative motion of solid surfaces, fluid layers, and material elements sliding against each other. There are several types of friction:
Dry friction is a force that opposes the relative lateral motion of two solid surfaces in contact. Dry friction is subdivided into static friction ("stiction") between non-moving surfaces, and kinetic friction between moving surfaces. With the exception of atomic or molecular friction, dry friction generally arises from the interaction of surface features, known as asperities (see Figure 1). 
Fluid friction describes the friction between layers of a viscous fluid that are moving relative to each other.

Lubricated friction is a case of fluid friction where a lubricant fluid separates two solid surfaces.

Skin friction is a component of drag, the force resisting the motion of a fluid across the surface of a body.
Internal friction is the force resisting motion between the elements making up a solid material while it undergoes deformation.

When surfaces in contact move relative to each other, the friction between the two surfaces converts kinetic energy into thermal energy (that is, it converts work to heat). This property can have dramatic consequences, as illustrated by the use of friction created by rubbing pieces of wood together to start a fire. Kinetic energy is converted to thermal energy whenever motion with friction occurs, for example when a viscous fluid is stirred. Another important consequence of many types of friction can be wear, which may lead to performance degradation or damage to components. Friction is a component of the science of tribology.

Friction is desirable and important in supplying traction to facilitate motion on land. Most land vehicles rely on friction for acceleration, deceleration and changing direction. Sudden reductions in traction can cause loss of control and accidents.
 
Friction is not itself a fundamental force. Dry friction arises from a combination of inter-surface adhesion, surface roughness, surface deformation, and surface contamination. The complexity of these interactions makes the calculation of friction from first principles  impractical and necessitates the use of empirical methods for analysis and the development of theory.

Friction is a non-conservative force – work done against friction is path dependent. In the presence of friction, some kinetic energy is always transformed to thermal energy, so mechanical energy is not conserved.

History
The Greeks, including Aristotle, Vitruvius, and Pliny the Elder, were interested in the cause and mitigation of friction. They were aware of differences between static and kinetic friction with Themistius stating in 350  that "it is easier to further the motion of a moving body than to move a body at rest".

The classic laws of sliding friction were discovered by Leonardo da Vinci  in 1493, a pioneer in tribology, but the laws documented in his notebooks were not published and remained unknown. These laws were rediscovered by Guillaume Amontons in 1699 and became known as Amonton's three laws of dry friction.   Amontons presented the nature of friction in terms of surface irregularities and the force required to raise the weight pressing the surfaces together. This view was further elaborated by Bernard Forest de Bélidor and Leonhard Euler (1750), who derived the angle of repose of a weight on an inclined plane and first distinguished between static and kinetic friction.
John Theophilus Desaguliers (1734) first recognized the role of adhesion in friction. Microscopic forces cause surfaces to stick together; he proposed that friction was the force necessary to tear the adhering surfaces apart.
 
The understanding of friction was further developed by Charles-Augustin de Coulomb (1785). Coulomb investigated the influence of four main factors on friction: the nature of the materials in contact and their surface coatings; the extent of the surface area; the normal pressure (or load); and the length of time that the surfaces remained in contact (time of repose). Coulomb further considered the influence of sliding velocity, temperature and humidity, in order to decide between the different explanations on the nature of friction that had been proposed. The distinction between static and dynamic friction is made in Coulomb's friction law (see below), although this distinction was already drawn by Johann Andreas von Segner in 1758.
The effect of the time of repose was explained by Pieter van Musschenbroek (1762) by considering the surfaces of fibrous materials, with fibers meshing together, which takes a finite time in which the friction increases.

John Leslie (1766–1832) noted a weakness in the views of Amontons and Coulomb: If friction arises from a weight being drawn up the inclined plane of successive asperities, why then isn't it balanced through descending the opposite slope? Leslie was equally skeptical about the role of adhesion proposed by Desaguliers, which should on the whole have the same tendency to accelerate as to retard the motion. In Leslie's view, friction should be seen as a time-dependent process of flattening, pressing down asperities, which creates new obstacles in what were cavities before.

Arthur Jules Morin (1833) developed the concept of sliding versus rolling friction.  Osborne Reynolds (1866) derived the equation of viscous flow.  This completed the classic empirical model of friction (static, kinetic, and fluid) commonly used today in engineering. In 1877,  Fleeming Jenkin and J. A. Ewing investigated the continuity between static and kinetic friction.

The focus of research during the 20th century has been to understand the physical mechanisms behind friction. Frank Philip Bowden and David Tabor (1950) showed that, at a microscopic level, the actual area of contact between surfaces is a very small fraction of the apparent area.  This actual area of contact, caused by asperities increases with pressure. The development of the atomic force microscope (ca. 1986)  enabled scientists to study friction at the atomic scale, showing that, on that scale, dry friction is the product of the inter-surface shear stress and the contact area. These two discoveries explain Amonton's first law (below); the macroscopic proportionality between normal force and static frictional force between dry surfaces.

Laws of dry friction
The elementary property of sliding (kinetic) friction were discovered by experiment in the 15th to 18th centuries and were expressed as three empirical laws:
Amontons'  First Law: The force of friction is directly proportional to the applied load.
Amontons' Second Law: The force of friction is independent of the apparent area of contact.
Coulomb's Law of Friction: Kinetic friction is independent of the sliding velocity.

Dry friction
Dry friction resists relative lateral motion of two solid surfaces in contact. The two regimes of dry friction are 'static friction' ("stiction") between non-moving surfaces, and kinetic friction (sometimes called sliding friction or dynamic friction) between moving surfaces.

Coulomb friction, named after Charles-Augustin de Coulomb, is an approximate model used to calculate the force of dry friction. It is governed by the model:

where
 is the force of friction exerted by each surface on the other.  It is parallel to the surface, in a direction opposite to the net applied force.
 is the coefficient of friction, which is an empirical property of the contacting materials,
 is the normal force exerted by each surface on the other, directed perpendicular (normal) to the surface.

Thus, in the static case, the frictional force is exactly what it must be in order to prevent motion between the surfaces; it balances the net force tending to cause such motion. In this case, rather than providing an estimate of the actual frictional force, the Coulomb approximation provides a threshold value for this force, above which motion would commence. This maximum force is known as traction.

The force of friction is always exerted in a direction that opposes movement (for kinetic friction) or potential movement (for static friction) between the two surfaces. For example, a curling stone sliding along the ice experiences a kinetic force slowing it down. For an example of potential movement, the drive wheels of an accelerating car experience a frictional force pointing forward; if they did not, the wheels would spin, and the rubber would slide backwards along the pavement. Note that it is not the direction of movement of the vehicle they oppose, it is the direction of (potential) sliding between tire and road.

Normal force

The normal force is defined as the net force compressing two parallel surfaces together, and its direction is perpendicular to the surfaces. In the simple case of a mass resting on a horizontal surface, the only component of the normal force is the force due to gravity, where . In this case, conditions of equilibrium tell us that the magnitude of the friction force is zero, . In fact, the friction force always satisfies , with equality reached only at a critical ramp angle (given by ) that is steep enough to initiate sliding. 

The friction coefficient is an empirical (experimentally measured) structural property that depends only on various aspects of the contacting materials, such as surface roughness. The coefficient of friction is not a function of mass or volume. For instance, a large aluminum block has the same coefficient of friction as a small aluminum block. However, the magnitude of the friction force itself depends on the normal force, and hence on the mass of the block. 

Depending on the situation, the calculation of the normal force  might include forces other than gravity. Thus,  in general. Sliding commences only after this frictional force reaches the value . Until then, friction is whatever it needs to be to provide equilibrium, so it can be treated as simply a reaction.  

The normal force and the frictional force are ultimately determined using vector analysis, usually via a free body diagram. 

In general, process for solving any statics problem with friction is to treat contacting surfaces tentatively as immovable so that the corresponding tangential reaction force between them can be calculated. If this frictional reaction force satisfies , then the tentative assumption was correct, and it is the actual frictional force.

Coefficient of friction

The coefficient of friction (COF), often symbolized by the Greek letter µ, is a dimensionless scalar value which equals the ratio of the force of friction between two bodies and the force pressing them together, either during or at the onset of slipping. The coefficient of friction depends on the materials used; for example, ice on steel has a low coefficient of friction, while rubber on pavement has a high coefficient of friction. Coefficients of friction range from near zero to greater than one. The coefficient of friction between two surfaces of similar metals is greater than that between two surfaces of different metals; for example, brass has a higher coefficient of friction when moved against brass, but less if moved against steel or aluminum.

For surfaces at rest relative to each other, where  is the coefficient of static friction. This is usually larger than its kinetic counterpart. The coefficient of static friction exhibited by a pair of contacting surfaces depends upon the combined effects of material deformation characteristics and surface roughness, both of which have their origins in the chemical bonding between atoms in each of the bulk materials and between the material surfaces and any adsorbed material. The fractality of surfaces, a parameter describing the scaling behavior of surface asperities, is known to play an important role in determining the magnitude of the static friction.

For surfaces in relative motion , where  is the coefficient of kinetic friction.

Arthur Morin introduced the term and demonstrated the utility of the coefficient of friction. The coefficient of friction is an empirical measurementit has to be measured experimentally, and cannot be found through calculations. Rougher surfaces tend to have higher effective values. Both static and kinetic coefficients of friction depend on the pair of surfaces in contact; for a given pair of surfaces, the coefficient of static friction is usually larger than that of kinetic friction; in some sets the two coefficients are equal, such as teflon-on-teflon.

Most dry materials in combination have friction coefficient values between 0.3 and 0.6. Values outside this range are rarer, but teflon, for example, can have a coefficient as low as 0.04. A value of zero would mean no friction at all, an elusive property. Rubber in contact with other surfaces can yield friction coefficients from 1 to 2. Occasionally it is maintained that μ is always < 1, but this is not true. While in most relevant applications μ < 1, a value above 1 merely implies that the force required to slide an object along the surface is greater than the normal force of the surface on the object. For example, silicone rubber or acrylic rubber-coated surfaces have a coefficient of friction that can be substantially larger than 1.

While it is often stated that the COF is a "material property," it is better categorized as a "system property." Unlike true material properties (such as conductivity, dielectric constant, yield strength), the COF for any two materials depends on system variables like temperature, velocity, atmosphere and also what are now popularly described as aging and deaging times; as well as on geometric properties of the interface between the materials, namely surface structure. For example, a copper pin sliding against a thick copper plate can have a COF that varies from 0.6 at low speeds (metal sliding against metal) to below 0.2 at high speeds when the copper surface begins to melt due to frictional heating. The latter speed, of course, does not determine the COF uniquely; if the pin diameter is increased so that the frictional heating is removed rapidly, the temperature drops, the pin remains solid and the COF rises to that of a 'low speed' test.

Approximate coefficients of friction

Under certain conditions some materials have very low friction coefficients. An example is (highly ordered pyrolytic) graphite which can have a friction coefficient below 0.01.
This ultralow-friction regime is called superlubricity.

Static friction

Static friction is friction between two or more solid objects that are not moving relative to each other. For example, static friction can prevent an object from sliding down a sloped surface. The coefficient of static friction, typically denoted as μs, is usually higher than the coefficient of kinetic friction. Static friction is considered to arise as the result of surface roughness features across multiple length scales at solid surfaces. These features, known as asperities are present down to nano-scale dimensions and result in true solid to solid contact existing only at a limited number of points accounting for only a fraction of the apparent or nominal contact area. The linearity between applied load and true contact area, arising from asperity deformation, gives rise to the linearity between static frictional force and normal force, found for typical Amonton–Coulomb type friction.

The static friction force must be overcome by an applied force before an object can move. The maximum possible friction force between two surfaces before sliding begins is the product of the coefficient of static friction and the normal force: . Any force smaller than  attempting to slide one surface over the other is opposed by a frictional force of equal magnitude and opposite direction. Any force larger than  overcomes the force of static friction and causes sliding to occur. The instant sliding occurs, static friction is no longer applicable—the friction between the two surfaces is then called kinetic friction. However, an apparent static friction can be observed even in the case when the true static friction is zero. 
 
An example of static friction is the force that prevents a car wheel from slipping as it rolls on the ground. Even though the wheel is in motion, the patch of the tire in contact with the ground is stationary relative to the ground, so it is static rather than kinetic friction. Upon slipping, the wheel friction changes to kinetic friction.  An anti-lock braking system operates on the principle of allowing a locked wheel to resume rotating so that the car maintains static friction.
 
The maximum value of static friction, when motion is impending, is sometimes referred to as limiting friction,
although this term is not used universally.

Kinetic friction
Kinetic friction, also known as dynamic friction or sliding friction, occurs when two objects are moving relative to each other and rub together (like a sled on the ground). The coefficient of kinetic friction is typically denoted as μk, and is usually less than the coefficient of static friction for the same materials. However, Richard Feynman comments that "with dry metals it is very hard to show any difference."
The friction force between two surfaces after sliding begins is the product of the coefficient of kinetic friction and the normal force: . This is responsible for the Coulomb damping of an oscillating or vibrating system.

New models are beginning to show how kinetic friction can be greater than static friction. Kinetic friction is now understood, in many cases, to be primarily caused by chemical bonding between the surfaces, rather than interlocking asperities; however, in many other cases roughness effects are dominant, for example in rubber to road friction. Surface roughness and contact area affect kinetic friction for micro- and nano-scale objects where surface area forces dominate inertial forces.

The origin of kinetic friction at nanoscale can be explained by thermodynamics. Upon sliding, new surface forms at the back of a sliding true contact, and existing surface disappears at the front of it. Since all surfaces involve the thermodynamic surface energy, work must be spent in creating the new surface, and energy is released as heat in removing the surface. Thus, a force is required to move the back of the contact, and frictional heat is released at the front.

Angle of friction

For certain applications, it is more useful to define static friction in terms of the maximum angle before which one of the items will begin sliding. This is called the angle of friction or friction angle. It is defined as:

and thus:

where  is the angle from horizontal and μs is the static coefficient of friction between the objects. This formula can also be used to calculate μs from empirical measurements of the friction angle.

Friction at the atomic level
Determining the forces required to move atoms past each other is a challenge in designing nanomachines. In 2008 scientists for the first time were able to move a single atom across a surface, and measure the forces required. Using ultrahigh vacuum and nearly zero temperature (5 K), a modified atomic force microscope was used to drag a cobalt atom, and a carbon monoxide molecule, across surfaces of copper and platinum.

Limitations of the Coulomb model
The Coulomb approximation follows from the assumptions that: surfaces are in atomically close contact only over a small fraction of their overall area; that this contact area is proportional to the normal force (until saturation, which takes place when all area is in atomic contact); and that the frictional force is proportional to the applied normal force, independently of the contact area. The Coulomb approximation is fundamentally an empirical construct. It is a rule-of-thumb describing the approximate outcome of an extremely complicated physical interaction. The strength of the approximation is its simplicity and versatility. Though the relationship between normal force and frictional force is not exactly linear (and so the frictional force is not entirely independent of the contact area of the surfaces), the Coulomb approximation is an adequate representation of friction for the analysis of many physical systems.

When the surfaces are conjoined, Coulomb friction becomes a very poor approximation (for example, adhesive tape resists sliding even when there is no normal force, or a negative normal force). In this case, the frictional force may depend strongly on the area of contact. Some drag racing tires are adhesive for this reason. However, despite the complexity of the fundamental physics behind friction, the relationships are accurate enough to be useful in many applications.

"Negative" coefficient of friction
, a single study has demonstrated the potential for an effectively negative coefficient of friction in the low-load regime, meaning that a decrease in normal force leads to an increase in friction. This contradicts everyday experience in which an increase in normal force leads to an increase in friction.  This was reported in the journal Nature in October 2012 and involved the friction encountered by an atomic force microscope stylus when dragged across a graphene sheet in the presence of graphene-adsorbed oxygen.

Numerical simulation of the Coulomb model
Despite being a simplified model of friction, the Coulomb model is useful in many numerical simulation applications such as multibody systems and granular material. Even its most simple expression encapsulates the fundamental effects of sticking and sliding which are required in many applied cases, although specific algorithms have to be designed in order to efficiently numerically integrate mechanical systems with Coulomb friction and bilateral or unilateral contact. Some quite nonlinear effects, such as the so-called Painlevé paradoxes, may be encountered with Coulomb friction.

Dry friction and instabilities
Dry friction can induce several types of instabilities in mechanical systems which display a stable behaviour in the absence of friction. 
These instabilities may be caused by the decrease of the friction force with an increasing velocity of sliding, by material expansion due to heat generation during friction (the thermo-elastic instabilities), or by pure dynamic effects of sliding of two elastic materials (the Adams–Martins instabilities). The latter were originally discovered in 1995 by George G. Adams and João Arménio Correia Martins for smooth surfaces and were later found in periodic rough surfaces. In particular, friction-related dynamical instabilities are thought to be responsible for brake squeal and the 'song' of a glass harp, phenomena which involve stick and slip, modelled as a drop of friction coefficient with velocity.

A practically important case is the self-oscillation of the strings of bowed instruments such as the violin, cello, hurdy-gurdy, erhu, etc.

A connection between dry friction and flutter instability in a simple mechanical system has been discovered, watch the movie  for more details.

Frictional instabilities can lead to the formation of new self-organized patterns (or "secondary structures") at the sliding interface, such as in-situ formed tribofilms which are utilized for the reduction of friction and wear in so-called self-lubricating materials.

Fluid friction

Fluid friction occurs between fluid layers that are moving relative to each other. This internal resistance to flow is named viscosity. In everyday terms, the viscosity of a fluid is described as its "thickness". Thus, water is "thin", having a lower viscosity, while honey is "thick", having a higher viscosity. The less viscous the fluid, the greater its ease of deformation or movement.

All real fluids (except superfluids) offer some resistance to shearing and therefore are viscous. For teaching and explanatory purposes it is helpful to use the concept of an inviscid fluid or an ideal fluid which offers no resistance to shearing and so is not viscous.

Lubricated friction

Lubricated friction is a case of fluid friction where a fluid separates two solid surfaces. Lubrication is a technique employed to reduce wear of one or both surfaces in close proximity moving relative to each another by interposing a substance called a lubricant between the surfaces.

In most cases the applied load is carried by pressure generated within the fluid due to the frictional viscous resistance to motion of the lubricating fluid between the surfaces. Adequate lubrication allows smooth continuous operation of equipment, with only mild wear, and without excessive stresses or seizures at bearings. When lubrication breaks down, metal or other components can rub destructively over each other, causing heat and possibly damage or failure.

Skin friction

Skin friction arises from the interaction between the fluid and the skin of the body, and is directly related to the area of the surface of the body that is in contact with the fluid. Skin friction follows the drag equation and rises with the square of the velocity.

Skin friction is caused by viscous drag in the boundary layer around the object. There are two ways to decrease skin friction: the first is to shape the moving body so that smooth flow is possible, like an airfoil. The second method is to decrease the length and cross-section of the moving object as much as is practicable.

Internal friction

Internal friction is the force resisting motion between the elements making up a solid material while it undergoes deformation.

Plastic deformation in solids is an irreversible change in the internal molecular structure of an object. This change may be due to either (or both) an applied force or a change in temperature. The change of an object's shape is called strain. The force causing it is called stress.

Elastic deformation in solids is reversible change in the internal molecular structure of an object. Stress does not necessarily cause permanent change. As deformation occurs, internal forces oppose the applied force. If the applied stress is not too large these opposing forces may completely resist the applied force, allowing the object to assume a new equilibrium state and to return to its original shape when the force is removed. This is known as elastic deformation or elasticity.

Radiation friction
As a consequence of light pressure, Einstein in 1909 predicted the existence of "radiation friction" which would oppose the movement of matter. He wrote, "radiation will exert pressure on both sides of the plate. The forces of pressure exerted on the two sides are equal if the plate is at rest. However, if it is in motion, more radiation will be reflected on the surface that is ahead during the motion (front surface) than on the back surface. The backward-acting force of pressure exerted on the front surface is thus larger than the force of pressure acting on the back. Hence, as the resultant of the two forces, there remains a force that counteracts the motion of the plate and that increases with the velocity of the plate. We will call this resultant 'radiation friction' in brief."

Other types of friction

Rolling resistance

Rolling resistance is the force that resists the rolling of a wheel or other circular object along a surface caused by deformations in the object or surface. Generally the force of rolling resistance is less than that associated with kinetic friction. Typical values for the coefficient of rolling resistance are 0.001.
One of the most common examples of rolling resistance is the movement of motor vehicle tires on a road, a process which generates heat and sound as by-products.

Braking friction
Any wheel equipped with a brake is capable of generating a large retarding force, usually for the purpose of slowing and stopping a vehicle or piece of rotating machinery. Braking friction differs from rolling friction because the coefficient of friction for rolling friction is small whereas the coefficient of friction for braking friction is designed to be large by choice of materials for brake pads.

Triboelectric effect

Rubbing dissimilar materials against one another can cause a build-up of electrostatic charge, which can be hazardous if flammable gases or vapours are present. When the static build-up discharges, explosions can be caused by ignition of the flammable mixture.

Belt friction

Belt friction is a physical property observed from the forces acting on a belt wrapped around a pulley, when one end is being pulled. The resulting tension, which acts on both ends of the belt, can be modeled by the belt friction equation.

In practice, the theoretical tension acting on the belt or rope calculated by the belt friction equation can be compared to the maximum tension the belt can support. This helps a designer of such a rig to know how many times the belt or rope must be wrapped around the pulley to prevent it from slipping. Mountain climbers and sailing crews demonstrate a standard knowledge of belt friction when accomplishing basic tasks.

Reducing friction

Devices
Devices such as wheels, ball bearings, roller bearings, and air cushion or other types of fluid bearings can change sliding friction into a much smaller type of rolling friction.

Many thermoplastic materials such as nylon, HDPE and PTFE are commonly used in low friction bearings. They are especially useful because the coefficient of friction falls with increasing imposed load. For improved wear resistance, very high molecular weight grades are usually specified for heavy duty or critical bearings.

Lubricants
A common way to reduce friction is by using a lubricant, such as oil, water, or grease, which is placed between the two surfaces, often dramatically lessening the coefficient of friction. The science of friction and lubrication is called tribology. Lubricant technology is when lubricants are mixed with the application of science, especially to industrial or commercial objectives.

Superlubricity, a recently discovered effect, has been observed in graphite: it is the substantial decrease of friction between two sliding objects, approaching zero levels. A very small amount of frictional energy would still be dissipated.

Lubricants to overcome friction need not always be thin, turbulent fluids or powdery solids such as graphite and talc; acoustic lubrication actually uses sound as a lubricant.

Another way to reduce friction between two parts is to superimpose micro-scale vibration to one of the parts. This can be sinusoidal vibration as used in ultrasound-assisted cutting or vibration noise, known as dither.

Energy of friction
According to the law of conservation of energy, no energy is destroyed due to friction, though it may be lost to the system of concern. Energy is transformed from other forms into thermal energy. A sliding hockey puck comes to rest because friction converts its kinetic energy into heat which raises the thermal energy of the puck and the ice surface. Since heat quickly dissipates, many early philosophers, including Aristotle, wrongly concluded that moving objects lose energy without a driving force.

When an object is pushed along a surface along a path C, the energy converted to heat is given by a line integral, in accordance with the definition of work
   

where
  is the friction force,
  is the vector obtained by multiplying the magnitude of the normal force by a unit vector pointing against the object's motion,
  is the coefficient of kinetic friction, which is inside the integral because it may vary from location to location (e.g. if the material changes along the path),
  is the position of the object.

Energy lost to a system as a result of friction is a classic example of thermodynamic irreversibility.

Work of friction
In the reference frame of the interface between two surfaces, static friction does no work, because there is never displacement between the surfaces. In the same reference frame, kinetic friction is always in the direction opposite the motion, and does negative work. However, friction can do positive work in certain frames of reference. One can see this by placing a heavy box on a rug, then pulling on the rug quickly. In this case, the box slides backwards relative to the rug, but moves forward relative to the frame of reference in which the floor is stationary. Thus, the kinetic friction between the box and rug accelerates the box in the same direction that the box moves, doing positive work.

The work done by friction can translate into deformation, wear, and heat that can affect the contact surface properties (even the coefficient of friction between the surfaces). This can be beneficial as in polishing. The work of friction is used to mix and join materials such as in the process of friction welding. Excessive erosion or wear of mating sliding surfaces occurs when work due to frictional forces rise to unacceptable levels. Harder corrosion particles caught between mating surfaces in relative motion (fretting) exacerbates wear of frictional forces. As surfaces are worn by work due to friction, fit and surface finish of an object may degrade until it no longer functions properly. For example, bearing seizure or failure may result from excessive wear due to work of friction.

Applications
Friction is an important factor in many engineering disciplines.

Transportation
Automobile brakes inherently rely on friction, slowing a vehicle by converting its kinetic energy into heat. Incidentally, dispersing this large amount of heat safely is one technical challenge in designing brake systems. Disk brakes rely on friction between a disc and brake pads that are squeezed transversely against the rotating disc. In drum brakes, brake shoes or pads are pressed outwards against a rotating cylinder (brake drum) to create friction. Since braking discs can be more efficiently cooled than drums, disc brakes have better stopping performance.
Rail adhesion refers to the grip wheels of a train have on the rails, see Frictional contact mechanics.
Road slipperiness is an important design and safety factor for automobiles
Split friction is a particularly dangerous condition arising due to varying friction on either side of a car.
Road texture affects the interaction of tires and the driving surface.

Measurement
A tribometer is an instrument that measures friction on a surface.
A profilograph is a device used to measure pavement surface roughness.

Household usage
Friction is used to heat and ignite matchsticks (friction between the head of a matchstick and the rubbing surface of the match box).
Sticky pads are used to prevent object from slipping off smooth surfaces by effectively increasing the friction coefficient between the surface and the object.

See also

Contact dynamics
Contact mechanics
Factor of adhesion
Friction Acoustics
Frictionless plane
Galling
Non-smooth mechanics
Normal contact stiffness
Stick-slip phenomenon
Transient friction loading
Triboelectric effect
Unilateral contact
Friction torque

References

External links

Coefficients of Friction – tables of coefficients, plus many links
Measurement of friction power
Physclips: Mechanics with animations and video clips from the University of New South Wales
Values for Coefficient of Friction – CRC Handbook of Chemistry and Physics
Characteristic Phenomena in Conveyor Chain
Atomic-scale Friction Research and Education Synergy Hub (AFRESH) an Engineering Virtual Organization for the atomic-scale friction community to share, archive, link, and discuss data, knowledge and tools related to atomic-scale friction.
Coefficients of friction of various material pairs in atmosphere and vacuum.

 
Classical mechanics
Force
Tribology